New American Gospel is the second studio album by American heavy metal band Lamb of God, as well as their first album under that name (they were originally known as Burn the Priest). It was released in 2000 through Prosthetic Records. New American Gospel is also the first release with Willie Adler on guitar, who replaced Abe Spear.

Metal Blade Records reissued a remastered version of New American Gospel in 2006 with four bonus tracks. The remastered version contains a note on the inlay that explains that the sound of the album is less polished than their newer work, in part due to time constraints as well as heavy drinking. It has sold over 100,000 copies in the United States.

Reception

Revolver magazine called New American Gospel one of the "69 Greatest Heavy Metal Albums of All Time". NME said the album "harks back to the days when Slayer ruled the kingdom of metal with speedy riffs and nihilism", and described the sound as "ferocious". Kerrang! said that New American Gospel "is dawn for the most brutally aggressive band since Pantera." CMJ described New American Gospel as "grindcore and death metal for the metalhead kids". Exclaim! compared New American Gospel to bands such as Pantera and Meshuggah, noted its "truly killer snare drum sound", and described the album in general as "a thoroughly satisfying listen and an innovative, real, heavy and scary metal album".

In 2020, it was named one of the 20 best metal albums of 2000 by Metal Hammer magazine.

Track listing

Personnel
Credits taken from Lamb of God's official website.

Lamb of God
 Randy Blythe – vocals
 Mark Morton – lead guitar
 Willie Adler – rhythm guitar
 John Campbell – bass
 Chris Adler – drums, production, mixing, analog editing

Additional personnel
 Steve Austin – vocals on "Terror and Hubris in the House of Frank Pollard", production, mixing, engineering, analog editing, digital editing, mastering
 Lamb of God – production, mixing
 Dave Murello – digital editing
 Ryan Smith – remastering at Sterling Sound

References

2000 debut albums
Lamb of God (band) albums
Prosthetic Records albums
Metal Blade Records albums